Mourad Mahour Ahmed Bacha (born 16 June 1961) is an Algerian former track and field athlete who competed in the decathlon and javelin throw. Bacha was among the foremost African and Arab decathletes in the 1980s and early 1990s.

He won 23 national titles in his career across decathlon and various field events, including nine javelin titles. He was a five-time African champion – four times in decathlon and once in javelin. He was also twice the decathlon gold medallist at the All-Africa Games, winning in 1987 and 1991. He won three straight decathlon titles at the Arab Athletics Championships from 1981 to 1987 and was a double gold medallist at the 1985 Pan Arab Games, topping both the decathlon and javelin podiums.

Bacha made one appearance at the global level, at the 1983 World Championships in Athletics. He failed to record a valid mark in the shot put event and opted not to finish the competition.

He set a lifetime best of 7934 points for the decathlon on 9 July 1985 in Algiers.

International competitions

National titles
Algerian Athletics Championships
Pole vault: 1982, 1984, 1985
Shot put: 1983, 1984, 1985, 1986
Discus throw: 1985, 1991, 1992, 1993
Javelin throw: 1983, 1984, 1985, 1986, 1987, 1988, 1989, 1992, 1993
Decathlon: 1982, 1984, 1992

References

External links



Living people
1961 births
Algerian decathletes
World Athletics Championships athletes for Algeria
Algerian javelin throwers
Male javelin throwers
Algerian male pole vaulters
African Games gold medalists for Algeria
African Games medalists in athletics (track and field)
Athletes (track and field) at the 1987 All-Africa Games
Athletes (track and field) at the 1991 All-Africa Games
21st-century Algerian people
20th-century Algerian people